Gwallog ap Lleenog (Old Welsh Guallauc, Middle Welsh Gwallawc; his father's name is spelled variously Lleinauc, Lleynna[u]c, Lleenawc, and Llennawc) was a hero of the Hen Ogledd. He has long been considered a probable sixth-century king of the sub-Roman state of Elmet in the Leeds area of modern Yorkshire, though some more recent scholarship would identify him more tentatively simply as a 'king of an unidentified region in the north'.

Life

Gwallog is most clearly attested in a note incorporated into Anglo-Saxon royal genealogies of Northumbrian kings found in London, British Library, MS Harley 3859 (the earliest manuscript of the Historia Brittonum). These are thought to originate in a perhaps eighth-century source and so to be relatively reliable. Commenting on the reign of the Bernician king Hussa, the regnal list states

Contra illum quattuor reges, Urbgen et Riderchen et Guallanc (leg. Guallauc) et Morcant, dimicaverunt. Deodric contra illum Urbgen cum filiis dimicabat fortiter--in illo autem tempore aliquando hostes, nunc cives vincebantur--et ipse conclusit eos tribus diebus et noctibus in insula Metcaud et, dum erat in expeditione, iugulatus est, Morcante destinante pro invidia, quia in ipso prae omnibus regibus virtus maxima erat instauratione belli.

Against him fought four kings, Urbgen (Urien) and Riderc Hen (Rhydderch Hen) and Guallauc (Gwallawg) and Morcant (Morgant). Deodric fought bravely with his sons against that Urbgen--at that time sometimes the enemy, now the citizens, were being overcome--and he shut them up three days and nights in the island of Metcaud (Lindisfarne), and, while he was on an expedition, he was murdered at the instance of Morcant out of envy, because in him above all the kings was the greatest skill in the renewing of battle.

Thus it appears that Gwallog joined a group of Brittonic kings, including Urien Rheged, Rhydderch Hael and Morgant Bwlch of Bryneich, in an attempt to defeat the Angles of Bernicia. This endeavour failed after Urien was slain.

Gwallog is the addressee of two poems in the Book of Taliesin which Ifor Williams identified on linguistic and historical grounds as (in part) plausibly originating in the sixth century, and possibly being genuine praise-poems addressed to Gwallog. These afford some evidence that Gwallog was a king of Elmet. If so, he was apparently succeeded by Ceredig, the last king of Elmet, who was deposed by St. Edwin of Deira; this would be consistent with the appearance of a 'Ceretic, son of Gwallawg' in one of the Welsh Triads. However, as evidence for sixth-century historical realities, this evidence is very tenuous.

Later reputation

The somewhat later cycle of Middle Welsh poems associated with Llywarch Hen suggests that Gwallog later made war against Urien's former kingdom of Rheged in concert with Dunod Fawr of the Northern Pennines, attacking Urien's sons. Here, Gwallog is given the epithet Marchog Trin, meaning "battle horseman". Again, this poetry probably tells us more about later legends of Gwallog than any sixth-century history.

Over time, Gwallog evolved into a semi-mythological figure akin to Arthur. In the medieval text Geraint son of Erbin, he is named as one of Arthur's knights and also appears in the Welsh triads as one of the "Three Armed Warriors of the Island of Britain" and one of the "Three Battle Pillars of the Island of Britain". Gwallog is also mentioned in the Black Book of Carmarthen poem "Ymddiddan Gwyddno Garanhir a Gwyn ap Nudd" as one of the slain warriors escorted to their graves by Gwyn ap Nudd, the lord of the Welsh Otherworld.
 
The medieval Welsh Bonedd y Saint claims that Gwallog was the father of Saint Dwywe, though this is unlikely to be based on sound historical information.

References 

Northern Brythonic monarchs
Monarchs of Elmet
Hen Ogledd
6th-century monarchs in Europe